The 2020–21 Sydney FC W-League season was the club's thirteenth season in the W-League, the premier competition for women's football in Australia.

Players

Squad information

W-League

League table

Regular season

Finals series

References

Sydney FC (A-League Women) seasons
Sydney FC